The Jazz Jamboree Festival, one of the largest and oldest jazz festivals in Europe, takes place in Warsaw. Organized by Jazz Jamboree Foundation.

History
The first Jazz Jamboree was organised by Hot-Club Hybrydy. It was three days long (18 to 21 September 1958) and it was called "Jazz 58". The first three editions of the festival took place in the student's club Stodoła (with some of the concerts in Cracow). Then the venue was changed to Filharmonia Narodowa, and since 1965 all editions have taken place in Sala Kongresowa in Palace of Culture and Science in Warsaw.

The name "Jazz Jamboree" was coined by Leopold Tyrmand.

The Jazz Jamboree Foundation was the festival's long-time organizer. Since 2017, it has been the Jazzarium Foundation.

References

External links
 Jazz Jamboree

Jazz festivals in Poland
Recurring events established in 1958